The Sand River (or Manyeleti River) is a river in the Mpumalanga lowveld flowing south-eastwards through the Sabi Sand Game Reserve for  and joining the Sabie River  east of Skukuza rest camp in the Kruger National Park.

Tributaries
 Hukumurhi
 Khokhovela River
 Klein Sand River
 Lephong
 Magoso
 Phungwe
 Merry Pebble Stream
 Mlowati
 Molapakgomo
 Mutlumuvi River
 Snuifspruit

References

Rivers of Mpumalanga